Karina Rebeca Buttner Naumann (born 1983) is a Paraguayan beauty queen who won Miss Paraguay contest in 2005, so  qualifying for that year's Miss Universe contest in Thailand.

References

1983 births
Miss Universe 2005 contestants
Miss World 2003 delegates
Living people
Paraguayan beauty pageant winners
Paraguayan female models
People from Asunción
Paraguayan people of German descent